1971 is a 2007 Indian Hindi-language war drama film directed by Amrit Sagar, and written by Piyush Mishra and Amrit Sagar, based on a true story of prisoners of war after the Indo-Pakistani War of 1971. The film features an ensemble cast of Manoj Bajpayee, Ravi Kishan, Piyush Mishra, Deepak Dobriyal and others. At the 55th National Film Awards, it won the National Film Award for Best Feature Film in Hindi The film is an account of the escape of six soldiers of the Indian Army taken as prisoners of war by the Pakistani Army, during the Indo-Pakistani War of 1971 that was preceded by rebellion of East Pakistan to separate itself from West Pakistan and create a new country.

Plot
The story takes place in Pakistan in 1977, six years after the 1971 Bangladesh Liberation War. Indian POWs from the 1971 war are kept in a prison camp along with several prisoners from the 1965 war. The 1971 POWs remain healthy, but the 1965 POWs have gone insane with despair. Major Suraj Singh of 18th Rajputana Rifles, Captain Kabir, Captain Jacob and Subedar Ahmed discuss the camp's good facilities. They have been moved into the camp out of several Pakistani jails. The next morning, an army truck is driving towards the camp with a few more Indian POWs. This group includes Flight Lieutenant Ram, Flight Lieutenant Gurtu and Colonel Puri. They steal a guard's wallet and get a Pakistani army ID card on the way. The POWs realize that they are in a place less than 200  km from the Indo-Pak border. The place, it is revealed later, is Chaklala. When Colonel Puri is told of this and the idea of an escape is put forward, he overrules it.  His reasons are that perhaps they will finally be repatriated and that a failed attempt could result in all of them being killed. Pakistani Colonel Shakoor arrives at the Chaklala camp; he informs Colonel Puri and Major Singh that all the POWs will be repatriated. However Ahmed steals a newspaper and discovers that this is a lie made to cover up the existence of Indian prisoners to the Red Cross, and plans to escape are initiated. As a celebration for 14 August, a Ghazal singer is invited to the camp. The soldiers, having managed to forge fake IDs and obtain Pakistani uniforms, plan to use the event as a cover for their escape. Ahmed sacrifices himself to blow up both the ammunition room and the electrical room, and dies in the explosion. The other five escape with the singer, who they let go. The Pakistanis discover the escape. After forcibly moving all the Indian POWs back to the Pakistani jails, they begin a massive manhunt for the five prisoners, led by Shakoor. They hide the identity of the prisoners as Indian POWs and claim they are common criminals. The singer is actually part of a Pakistani human rights commission and reports to the commission's leader that their government is illegally holding Indian POWs. The leader is angry at the deception and promises to inform the Red Cross. Jacob shoots himself unable to take the pain after he is injured during their stay at a hideout. Ram shoots Shakoor then destroys many of the search party's vehicles by exploding a grenade on himself, helping his comrades to evade capture. The human rights leader and the Red Cross arrive and question the Pakistani military about the missing POWs, but they are blocked from finding any serious results. Kabir's leg is mangled while driving a captured motorcycle during their escape, then becomes frostbitten by accident. He dies peacefully in his sleep as they reach very close to the Indian border. Suraj is shot and killed by Pakistanis as he is about to cross to the Indian side and his body is taken away by the Pakistanis. Gurtu witnesses Suraj's death and is recaptured by the Pakistanis offscreen.

It is now in 2007. The place is Multan Jail in Pakistan. We see an old man walking in the prison compound. He has made five little mounds of earth and he is putting a few flowers on them. He sits on the ground next to them and leafs through what was once Major Suraj Singh's prison diary. This old man is Gurtu. He says that it is impossible to live without hope, and that he is alive because of hope. It is revealed that there are still 54 Indian POWs from 1971 in Pakistani jails, and they were last seen alive in 1988.

Cast
 Manoj Bajpayee as Major Suraj Singh
 Ravi Kishan as Capt. Jacob
 Piyush Mishra as Maj. Bilal Malik
 Manav Kaul as Flight Lt. Ram
 Deepak Dobriyal as Flight Lt. Gurtu
 Chittaranjan Giri as Subedar Ahmed
 Kumud Mishra as Capt. Kabir
 Vivek Mishra as Col. Shaharyar Khan
 Gyan Prakash as Col. Puri
 Bikramjeet Kanwarpal as Col. Shakoor Akhtar
 Sanjeev Wilson as Major Karamat Ali
 Satyajit Sharma as Commander of the Indian check post
 Pankaj Kalra as Major Azam Baig

Music
"Kaal Ke Antim Palon Tak" – Kailash Kher
"Saajana" (Film Version) – Harshdeep Kaur
"Sehlenge Hum Saare Sitam" – Shibani Kashyap
"Sada Bhangda Paun Nu" – Kailash Kher
"Sajna Arabian Sunrise" (Remix) – Harshdeep Kaur
"Bhangra Pauna" (Remix) – Kailash Kher

References

External links
 

2007 films
2007 drama films
Films set in 1971
Indian war drama films
Films based on Indo-Pakistani wars and conflicts
2000s Hindi-language films
Indian Army in films
Films that won the Best Audiography National Film Award
Best Hindi Feature Film National Film Award winners
Military of Pakistan in films
Films based on the Bangladesh Liberation War
Films set in East Pakistan